Franklin Township is a township in O'Brien County, Iowa, USA.

History
Franklin Township was founded in 1878. It was named for Benjamin Franklin.

References

Townships in O'Brien County, Iowa
Townships in Iowa